PAF Public School may refer to:
PAF Public School Sargodha, a Pakistan Air Force operated boarding school in Sargodha, Pakistan
PAF Public School Lower Topa, a Pakistan Air Force operated boarding school in Murree, Pakistan